Truth be told is a figure of speech, a scheme that is a shortened version of the phrase, "If the truth be told". It is a prepositional phrase meaning "to be honest" or "in all honesty" — that what follows is the truth. It may also refer to:

Books 
 Truth Be Told (novel) or Are You Sleeping, a 2017 novel by Kathleen Barber; basis for the 2019 TV series (see below)
 Truth Be Told: My Journey Through Life and the Law, a 2019 book by Beverley McLachlin

Film and television 
 Truth Be Told (2002 film), a film starring Blair Underwood
 Truth Be Told (2012 film), a documentary about growing up in the Jehovah's Witnesses denomination
 Truth Be Told (2015 TV series), an American sitcom
 Truth Be Told (2019 TV series), an American drama series

Television episodes 
 "Truth Be Told" (Alias)
 "Truth Be Told" (Boston Legal)
 "Truth Be Told" (Dexter)
 "Truth Be Told" (Modern Family)
 "The Truth Be Told", an episode of Roseanne

Music 
 Truth Be Told (Blues Traveler album), 2003
 Truth Be Told (Shed Seven album), 2001
 Truth Be Told, Part 1, an EP by Greyson Chance, 2012
 "Truth Be Told", a song by Architects from Daybreaker
 "Truth Be Told", a song by Megadeth from The System Has Failed
 "Truth Be Told", a song by Phinehas from Till the End

See also
Let the Truth Be Told (disambiguation)